Ved Mata Gaytri Mandir is a temple of the Maa Gayatri Devi. The name Gayatri Mandir derives from the Acharya of Gayatri Mission, Gaytari Mandir is a famous Temple. The Gayatri Mandir is founded by Mr. Rampravesh Kushwaha.This Temple is situated in Kushinagar, Uttar Pradesh, India since a long time. Gayatri Mandir temple performs various cultural and social activities and serves as the cultural hub of the city. Gayatri Mandir Arrange every year Nav Kundiy Gaytri Gayatri Mhayagya. During  Last Day Of Yagya Gaytri Mandir also Arrange Mass wedding ceremonies (Garib Var-Kanyaon Ki Samoohik Vivah).

References

2011 establishments in Uttar Pradesh